Sworn Enemy: Heaven is the fourth studio album by the Austrian death metal band Thirdmoon, released through FM Records in 2004.

Track listing
"Dementia"
"Persecution"
"Unleash the soul"
"Blood for blood"
"Strangled"
"Suicide spawn"
"Bleed your God"
"Human shockbreed"
"Decayed in heaven"
"Amen"
"Forsaken"
"Stigma"

2004 albums
Thirdmoon albums